The 1921 All-Pro Team represented the All-Pro team for the 1921 season of the American Professional Football Association (APFA), later renamed the National Football League (NFL). It was compiled by the Buffalo Evening News.

Team

References

All-Pro Teams
All Pro